SON-50 (NATO reporting name Flap Wheel) is a type of Russian\Soviet fire director radar for 57 mm anti-aircraft guns.

It has been widely employed during the Vietnam war.

See also
SON-9
SON-30

External links
S-60 Anti-Aircraft Artillery

Ground radars
Russian and Soviet military radars